
Year 701 (DCCI) was a common year starting on Saturday (link will display the full calendar) of the Julian calendar. The denomination 701 for this year has been used since the early medieval period, when the Anno Domini calendar era became the prevalent method in Europe for naming years.

Events 
 By place 

 Europe 
 Raginpert dies, and King Liutpert (succeeded and deposed in 700) returns to the throne of the Lombards. Raginpert's son Aripert captures Liutpert at his capital in Pavia, and will have him strangled in his bath. Aripert becomes new ruler of the Lombard Kingdom in Italy.
 King Egica dies, possibly assassinated in a plot led by Roderic. He is succeeded by his son Wittiza as king of the Visigoths (approximate date).

 Balkans 
 Asparuh, founder of the First Bulgarian Empire, dies after a 20-year reign. He is succeeded by his son Tervel, who becomes ruler (khan) of the Bulgarians.

 Arabian Empire 
 Battle of Dayr al-Jamajim: Caliph Abd al-Malik ibn Marwan sends Syrian troops to reinforce the Muslim army of Al-Hajjaj ibn Yusuf. He faces a 200,000-man army under Abd al-Rahman ibn Muhammad ibn al-Ash'ath near Kufa (modern Iraq). Al-Ash'ath is defeated, and his rebellion against the Umayyad Caliphate fails.
 Arab conquest of Armenia: Umayyad prince Muhammad ibn Marwan invades the Byzantine Armenian provinces east of the Euphrates; local commander Baanes surrenders before a large Arab army, and the population accepts a Muslim governor.
 Muslims from the Arabian Peninsula destroy the then-Axum-controlled port of Adulis, thus causing the decline of Ethiopian Christianity on the African Red Sea coast (approximate date).
 Arab merchants introduce Oriental spices into Mediterranean markets. Muslim merchant vessels visit the Maluku Islands (South East Asia) for the first time (approximate date).

 Japan 
 The Gagakuryo (Bureau of Court Music) is formed at the Imperial Court in Kyoto. Numerous types of music and dance are performed.
 Emperor Monmu becomes sole proprietor of all the nation's land, through a codification of political law (Code of Taihō).

 By topic 

 Religion 
 September 8 – Pope Sergius I dies at Rome after a 14-year reign. He is succeeded by John VI as the 85th pope of the Catholic Church.

Births 
 May 19 – Li Bai (or Li Po), Chinese poet (d. 762)
 September 22 – Shōmu, emperor of Japan (d. 756)
 Kōmyō, empress of Japan (d. 760)
 Yazid III, Muslim caliph (d. 744)

Deaths 
 September 8 – Pope Sergius I
 October 8 – Prince Yide (Li Chongrun), prince of the Tang dynasty, probable forced suicide (b. 682)
 October 9 – Princess Yongtai (Li Xianhui), princess of the Tang dynasty, probable forced suicide (b. 685)
 Asparuh, ruler of the First Bulgarian Empire
 Egica, king of the Visigoths (or 703)
 Raginpert, usurping king of the Lombards
 Yeon Namsan, military leader of Goguryeo (b. 639)

References